Robert Lowe (born 4 May 1945) is a former Paralympic athlete from Great Britain competing mainly in throwing events.

Lowe represented Great Britain at the 1984 Summer Paralympics in athletics taking a clean sweep of the field events of Javelin, Shot Put and Discus.

After he retired as a competitor, Lowe went onto coach the Great Britain bowls team at the 1988 Summer Paralympics in Seoul and was the International Paralympic Committee’s Chairman for Bowls from 1988-1996.

References

Paralympic athletes of Great Britain
Athletes (track and field) at the 1984 Summer Paralympics
Paralympic gold medalists for Great Britain
Living people
1945 births
Medalists at the 1984 Summer Paralympics
Paralympic medalists in athletics (track and field)
British male discus throwers
British male shot putters